The year 1988 was the 207th year of the Rattanakosin Kingdom of Thailand. It was the 43nd year in the reign of King Bhumibol Adulyadej (Rama IX), and is reckoned as year 2531 in the Buddhist Era.

Incumbents
King: Bhumibol Adulyadej 
Crown Prince: Vajiralongkorn
Prime Minister: 
 until 4 August: Prem Tinsulanonda
 starting 4 August: Chatichai Choonhavan
Supreme Patriarch: 
 until 27 August: Ariyavangsagatayana VII

Events

January

February
 19 February - ceasefire agreement ends Thai–Laotian Border War.

March

April
 5 April - Kuwait Airways Flight 422 hijacked by Lebanese guerillas (suspected Hezbollah) after departing from Bangkok. During the incident the flight, initially forced to land in Iran, travelled 3,200 miles from Mashhad in northeastern Iran to Larnaca, Cyprus, and finally to Algiers. Two hostages were killed, prior to the crisis ending on 20 April.

May
24 May - Miss Thailand Phonthip Nakhirankanok won the crown title of the Miss Universe 1988 held in Taipei, Taiwan.

June

July
 24 July - 1988 Thai general election - victory for the Thai Nation Party, which won 87 of the 357 seats. Voter turnout was 63.6%

August

September
9 September - Vietnam Airlines Flight 831 crashes with 76 fatalities.

October

November
10 November - Phra Narai Lintel returned to Thailand and widely celebrated.

December

Births
 December 4 – Mario Maurer, Thai model and actor

Deaths

See also
 1988 in Thai television
 List of Thai films of 1988

References

External links

 
Years of the 20th century in Thailand
Thailand
Thailand
1980s in Thailand